Klaas's cuckoo (Chrysococcyx klaas) is a species of cuckoo in the family Cuculidae which is native to the wooded regions of sub-Saharan Africa. The specific name honours Klaas, the Khoikhoi man who collected the type specimen.

Name 

The species was named  by French explorer François Le Vaillant in 1806, in his book  in recognition of his Khoikhoi servant and assistant, named Klaas, who found the type specimen. Le Vaillant wrote:

Le Vaillant's wish was honoured when the bird's first binomial name, Cuculus klaas, was applied by James Francis Stephens in 1815, and the tribute to Klaas has persisted to the present binomial.

The bird is the first known case of a species being named after an Indigenous individual, and Le Vaillant is the only colonial biologist to name bird species after local people.

Range
The species occurs throughout sub-Saharan Africa with the exception of very arid areas in the south-west.

Description

The species exhibits sexual dimorphism. Males have a glossy green body with few markings and plain white underparts. Females have a bronze-brown body, greenish wing coverts and faintly barred white underparts. Viewed in flight, the male is largely white with dark primaries and females appear mostly brown. Males and females both have a small white post-ocular patch.

Notes

References

Klaas's cuckoo
Birds of Sub-Saharan Africa
Birds of the Gulf of Guinea
Klaas's cuckoo
Taxonomy articles created by Polbot
Taxa named by James Francis Stephens